Harem  was a Norwegian reality TV series that aired on TV3, hosted by Mia Gundersen. The production company was Strix Televisjon AS. Four women got to choose between 18 men. The men who didn't get chosen, had to go home. The series was shot in the Maldives. The series premiered on 4 October 2001 and had only one season. There was also a Danish version and a Swedish version.

Contestants

Female
Karianne Jensen
Marit Knevelsrud
Elise Oftedal
Cathrine Småvik

Male

Ratings
The first episode of Harem was watched by 317 000 viewers, the second episode the viewership dropped to 123 000 viewers. The whole series had an average of between 163 000 and 125 000 viewers. The final episode was watched by 198 000 viewers

External links
 Damene overtar TV3 (Norwegian)
 Eventyr og erotikk på TV3 (Norwegian)

References

Norwegian reality television series
TV3 (Norway) original programming

no:Harem